Katty Tolla Piejos, (born 21 August 1981 in La Trinité, Martinique, French West Indies) is a French handball player.

Teams 
 Réveil Sportif (Gros-Morne, Martinique), 1993-2001 
 Havre Athletic Club Handball, 2001-2004 
 Metz Handball since 2004

Results  

 Champion of the French Championship  of second division (D2F) in 2002 (Le Havre)
 Fourth of the French Championship of the first division (D1F) in 2003 (Le Havre)
 Third of the French Championship of the first division (D1F) in 2004 (Le Havre)
 Champion of the French Championship of first division (D1F) in 2005, 2006, 2007, 2008, 2009 and 2011 (Metz)
 Win the French League Cup in 2005, 2006, 2007, 2008, 2009, 2010 and 2011 (Metz)
 Win the Bronze medal Of the European's Championship in 2006, in  Switzerland (French Team)
 Fifth in the World Championship in 2007, in France, with 2 matches played (French Team)

Awards
 Best player of the TIPIFF tournament, Paris 2006
 3rd best right wing of the French championship (D1F) 2007-2008

Statistics
 French Championship
 2002-2003: 27 goals, 1.3 goals per game, 0.51 of success
 2003-2004: 26 goals, 1.2 goals per game, 0.58 of success
 2004-2005: 25 goals, 1.2 goals per game, 0.50 of success
 2005-2006: 70 goals, 3.2 goals per game, 0.60 of success
 2006-2007: 77 goals, 3.5 goals per game, 0.56 of success
 2007-2008: 84 goals, 3.82 goals per game, 0.60 of success
2008-2009: 18 goals, 3.6 goals per game, 0.61 of success
 Champions league of the EHF
 2004-2005: 2 games, 7 goals, 3,5 goals per game
 2005-2006: 4 games, 14 goals, 3,5 goals per game
 2006-2007: 4 games, 13 goals, 3,25 goals per game
 2007-2008: 20 goals, 4 goals per game
 2008-2009: 13 goals, 4.3 goals per game, 0.68 of success
 EHF Cup
 2004-2005: 6 games, 4 goals, 0,67 goals per game
 2005-2006: 6 games, 7 goals, 1,17 goals per game
 2006-2007: 4 games, 16 goals, 4 goals per game
 2007-2008: 2 games, 9 goals, 4.5 goals per game
 French League Cup
2007-2008:3 games, 8 goals, 2.67 goals per game 
 French Team
 20 selections: 19 goals, 0.95 goals per game

References

External links 
  Havre Athlétic Club
  Metz Handball
  French Hand Ball Federation
  Femmes2defis

Living people
French female handball players
1981 births
People from La Trinité, Martinique
French people of Martiniquais descent
Mediterranean Games medalists in handball
Mediterranean Games gold medalists for France
Competitors at the 2009 Mediterranean Games